Simone Cantoni (Muggio, Switzerland , 1736- Gorgonzœla, Milan, Italy , 3 March 1818) was a Swiss architect of the Neoclassical period, active mainly in Northern Italy.

Biography
His father was his first mentor, but sent him as a young man to Rome to study classical architecture. He worked there in the studio of Luigi Vanvitelli. He received a prize from the Academy of Parma in 1764. He gained a post in Lombardy directing the construction of the Palazzo Mellerio in central Milan. Among his many works are the Villa Olmo in Como, Villa Cigalini in Bornate, Villa Giovia in Brescia, Villa Gallarati-Scotti in Oreno, Villa Muggiasca in Masino, Villa Raimondi in Olmo near Como, the seminary and facade of the lyceum in Como, and the Palazzo Vailetti in Bergamo.

After the fire in the Ducal Palace of Genoa in 1777, he restored the building by replacing the wooden ceiling. He erected the Pertusati House in Milan using Palladian proportions. He built the Palazzo Serbelloni in Milan. He also helped design the Church of San Michele in Vimercate, the church of Sant'Ambrogio e Simpliciano in Carate Brianza, and the church of Santissima Maria Annunciata in Ponte Lambro.

References

18th-century Italian people
18th-century Italian architects
19th-century Italian architects
1736 births
1818 deaths
Architects from Ticino
Italian neoclassical architects